Benjamin Appl (born 26 June 1982) is a German-British lyric baritone, a classical singer who has appeared world-wide in opera houses and concert halls, particularly known as a Lieder singer.

Early life and education

Born in Regensburg, Appl has two older brothers, with whom he sang as a chorister with the Regensburger Domspatzen, the boys' choir at the Regensburg Cathedral, performing in concerts across Europe and Asia. Following secondary school, rather than spending a compulsory year in the army he completed his alternative community service working for the Bayerischer Blinden- und Sehbehindertenbund in Regensburg, providing assistance to blind people in the community. He started training as a bank clerk at the Liga Bank in Regensburg. He then studied business administration at the University of Regensburg, graduating in 2009 with a diploma. His diploma thesis, an empirical study of withdrawn initial public offerings, received the highest possible marks. He was awarded a scholarship from the Studienstiftung des deutschen Volkes between 2007 and 2012.

While studying for his management diploma, he auditioned at the Musikhochschule Augsburg for the soloist class taught by Edith Wiens. Under her tutelage, he continued his vocal training from 2008 at the Hochschule für Musik und Theater München, and at the opera class at Bayerische Theaterakademie August Everding, based at the Prinzregententheater. He also participated in Helmut Deutsch's Lieder class.

In 2009, Appl met Dietrich Fischer-Dieskau at a public masterclass of the Schubertiade in Schwarzenberg, Austria, which led to his receiving private lessons as his last student until Fischer-Dieskau's death in May 2012.

In 2010, Appl moved to London to study at the Guildhall School of Music and Drama with Rudolf Piernay. During this time, he attended masterclasses with Brigitte Fassbaender, Gerald Finley, Christian Gerhaher, Thomas Hampson, and Peter Schreier, among others. In 2019, he became a British citizen.

Recitals

Appl has given recitals regularly at Wigmore Hall in London and the Schubertiade, and has performed at major venues including Festspielhaus Baden-Baden, Concertgebouw in Amsterdam, Elbphilharmonie in Hamburg, and the Musée du Louvre in Paris. He has performed at the Ravinia Festival, Rheingau Musik Festival, Schleswig-Holstein Musik Festival, Edinburgh International Festival, LIFE Victoria Festival Barcelona, Leeds Lieder and Oxford Lieder Festival.  His first recital at Carnegie Hall in New York City in May 2020 had to be cancelled due to the COVID-19 pandemic. He has collaborated with pianists Graham Johnson and James Baillieu, and has also performed recitals with Kit Armstrong, Kristian Bezuidenhout, Helmut Deutsch, Julius Drake, Boris Giltburg, Pavel Kolesnikov, Simon Lepper, Malcolm Martineau, Wolfram Rieger, Martin Stadtfeld and Roger Vignoles.

Opera

While studying at the August Everding Academy, Appl took part in opera and operetta productions, including appearing as Ypsheim-Gindelbach in Wiener Blut, Falke in Die Fledermaus by Johann Strauß, Schaunard in Puccini's La bohème and Baron Tusenbach in Tri sestry by Peter Eötvös. In London, he performed the roles of the Count in Mozart's Le nozze di Figaro, Bustamente in La Navarraise, Chevalier des Grieux in Le portrait de Manon, Dr Cajus in Nicolai's Die lustigen Weiber von Windsor, and the title role in Britten's Owen Wingrave. Further opera roles include Guglielmo in Mozart's Così fan tutte and Papageno in Die Zauberflöte, Ottokar in Weber's Der Freischütz, Ernesto in Il mondo della luna, F. Scott Fitzgerald in Susan Oswell's Zelda, and Adonis in Venus and Adonis. He appeared as Leo in Bernhard Gander's Das Leben am Rande der Milchstraße for Bregenzer Festspiele and Konzerthaus Vienna, the King in Orff's Die Kluge, Aeneas in Purcell's Dido and Aeneas for the Aldeburgh Festival and Brighton Festival, and Tusenbach again for the Berlin State Opera. In 2019, Appl performed the role of Guglielmo in Cosi fan tutte with the Mozartists, conducted by Ian Page.

Concerts
Appl has performed in concert with orchestras including the Academy of Ancient Music, Akademie für Alte Musik Berlin, the Bach-Collegium Stuttgart, Berliner Barocksolisten, Concerto Köln, Deutsche Kammerphilharmonie Bremen, the Dunedin Consort, Gabrieli Consort & Players, Les Violons du Roy, London Philharmonic Orchestra, NHK Symphony Orchestra, NDR Radiophilharmonie, Philadelphia Orchestra, the Royal Liverpool Philharmonic, Philharmonia Orchestra, the Seattle Symphony, the Symphony Orchestra of India, Vienna Symphony, and on multiple occasions with the major BBC Orchestras and Singers. He made his Proms debut in September 2015 singing Triumphlied by Brahms with Marin Alsop and the Orchestra of the Age of Enlightenment, and Orff's Carmina Burana with the BBC Concert Orchestra five days later. In December 2017, he performed alongside Diana Damrau in the ZDF Advent Concert at the Dresden Frauenkirche with the Staatskapelle Dresden conducted by Christian Thielemann, broadcast on national television. He has also performed regularly at the Hamburg State Opera, singing for several of John Neumeier's productions for the Hamburg Ballet.

Appl has worked with conductors including Marin Alsop, Ivor Bolton, John Butt, Christian Curnyn, Thomas Dausgaard, Johannes Debus, Edward Gardner, Reinhard Goebel, Michael Hofstetter, Paavo Järvi, Bernard Labadie, Alessandro De Marchi, Andrew Manze, Yannick Nézet-Séguin, Sir Roger Norrington, Vasily Petrenko, Helmuth Rilling, Yutaka Sado, Jordi Savall, Ulf Schirmer, Paul McCreesh, and Duncan Ward.

Awards
In 2012, Appl was awarded the German Schubert Society's German Schubert Prize.

Appl was a member of the BBC Radio 3 New Generation Artists scheme between 2014 and 2016. During the season 2015/16 he performed as an ECHO Rising Star, nominated by the Barbican Centre London, in some of Europe's most renowned concert halls including Het Concertgebouw Amsterdam, Philharmonie de Paris, Philharmonie Luxembourg and Kölner Philharmonie, Calouste Gulbenkian Foundation, Palau de la Música Catalana, Stockholm Concert Hall, Konzerthaus, Vienna, BOZAR Brussels and Laeiszhalle Hamburg. He also became a Wigmore Hall Emerging Talent in 2015.

Gramophone Classical Music Awards named him Young Artist of the Year in 2016. His debut album as an exclusive Sony Classical recording artist, "Heimat", won the Prix Dietrich Fischer-Dieskau (Best Lieder Singer) at the 2017/18  Orphées d'Or.

Repertoire

Benjamin Appl has a vast and varied song catalogue, but his repertoire also encompasses opera and concert works from the Renaissance through to the present day. He has been fortunate enough to have performed works written specifically for him by composers including Kit Armstrong, Marian Ingoldsby, György Kurtág, Nico Muhly, Susan Oswell and Matthias Pintscher. For the Konzerthaus Dortmund he participated over months in intensive working sessions with György Kurtág on his Hölderlin Gesänge, which were then performed in a special lecture recital in Dortmund in February 2020.

Teaching

Since September 2016 Benjamin Appl has taught at the Guildhall School of Music & Drama in London as a professor of German song. He has given masterclasses in Germany, Hong Kong, India, Ireland, Italy, Portugal, Switzerland, United Kingdom, the U.S. and Vietnam.

Recordings

 Felix Mendelssohn: Complete Songs with pianist Malcolm Martineau, Champs Hill Records, vol. 1 in 2014, vol. 2 in 2015
 Robert Schumann: Lieder and Duets, with Ann Murray (mezzo-soprano) and pianist Martineau, Linn Records, 2016
 Stunden, Tage, Ewigkeiten, songs with settings of Heinrich Heine, with pianist James Baillieu, Champs Hill, 2016
 Franz Schubert: Songs, live-Recording with pianist Graham Johnson, Wigmore Hall Live, 2016
 Georg Philipp Telemann: Reformation Oratorio 1755 TWV 13:18, Chor des Bayerischen Rundfunks, Bayerische Kammerphilharmonie, conducted by Reinhard Goebel, Sony Classical, 2017
 Heimat, with pianist James Baillieu, Sony Classical, 2017
 Johannes Brahms: The Complete Songs, vol. 7 with pianist Graham Johnson, Hyperion Records, 2018
 Johann Sebastian Bach: Arias and Sinfonias, Concerto Köln, Sony Classical, 2018
 Sibelius: Kullervo, with Helena Juntunen (soprano), BBC Scottish Symphony Orchestra, conducted by Thomas Dausgaard, Hyperion Records, 2019
 Luciano Berio: Transformation, arrangements of early songs by Gustav Mahler, Sinfonieorchester Basel, conducted by Ivor Bolton, Sony Classical, 2019 
 Fauré: The Secret Fauré III – Requiem, Op. 48, Balthasar-Neumann-Chor, Sinfonieorchester Basel, conducted by Bolton, Sony Classical, 2020
 Cantatas of the Bach Family, solo cantatas for bass by Carl Philipp Emanuel Bach, Johann Christoph Friedrich Bach and Johann Sebastian Bach, Berliner Barocksolisten, conducted by Reinhard Goebel, Hänssler Classic, 2020

Other projects

In autumn 2019 Benjamin Appl presented his own programme on BBC Radio 3 called A Singer's World, in which he gave insight into the life of a classical singer in the 21st century.  
In spring 2020 Appl was involved in a new movie project called Breaking Music, which was filmed during his visits of Buenos Aires and Berlin to discover tango, its history and similarities with as well as differences to Lieder. The film is scheduled to be broadcast later in 2020.

Appl, accompanied by James Baillieu, stars in the BBC film Winter Journey, featuring Schubert’s Winterreise, filmed in a tower on the snow-covered summit of the Julierpass in south-east Switzerland, broadcast on 27 February 2022.

References

External links 
 
 
 Sony Classical exclusive recording Artist Benjamin Appl
 Artist of IMG Artists, general management
 Artist of Artist Management Augstein & Hahn, representation in German-speaking countries
 Benjamin Appl: a baritone up front with the back story. Article about Benjamin Appl in Financial Times, 37 July 2018
 Ein unwahrscheinlicher Glücksfall. Article about Benjamin Appl in Die Welt, 27 November 2017 (in German)
 

German academics
University of Music and Performing Arts Munich alumni
Alumni of the Guildhall School of Music and Drama
University of Regensburg alumni
Academic staff of the University of Music and Performing Arts Munich
Living people
1982 births
Sony Music artists
German operatic baritones
20th-century German male pianists
21st-century German male opera singers
Academics of the Guildhall School of Music and Drama